HMS Merlin was launched in 1801 in South Shields as the collier Hercules. In July 1803, with the resumption of war with France, the Admiralty purchased her. She was one of about 20 such vessels that the navy would then employ primarily for convoy escort duties. She served on active duty until 1810, capturing one small privateer. She then served as a receiving ship until 1836 when the navy sold her for breaking up.


Career
The Admiralty purchased Hercules in July 1803, renaming her Merlin. From 20 July to 20 September she was at Deptford fitting out for naval service. Commander Edward Pelham Brenton commissioned her in September.
 
Sept Freres was armed with two guns and had a crew of 30 men under the command of Citizen Pollet. Milbrook anchored close to the lugger and came under fire from some field guns on shore. Though she took some hits, the British suffered no casualties. Head money was finally paid in May 1827.

At 8pm on 10 December, Shannon grounded on Tatihou Island, near Barfleur, during a heavy gale. Merlin spotted land thanks to a bolt of lighting and was able to wear off in time.

A shore battery fired on Shannon, killing some men. When it was clear that Shannon could not be gotten off, her captain surrendered. The French army then took the officers and men prisoners. Some French fishing boats took possession of Shannon but saw that her hull was so damaged that she would be impossible to refloat.

Merlin stood back into shore on the 16th and at 11.30am dispatched two boats of marines and sailors to destroy Shannon to prevent the French from salvaging her guns and stores. Despite heavy fire from the island's batteries the boarders were able to burn and destroy the frigate without suffering a single casualty.

Later in December, Merlin and  detained Traveller, Hall, master, which was sailing from Alexandria to Havre. They sent Traveller into Portsmouth.

On 25 May 1804 Merlin was part of a squadron of six vessels that captured Matilda.

The bomb vessels' shells and carcasses set the town on fire on 23 July. Merlin was one of only two British vessels that suffered hits from enemy fire and there were no British casualties. On 1 August, the vessels kept a continuous fire for three hours. Still, it is not clear that the bombardment did much damage to the French flotilla. On 22 July Merlin captured the Shepherdess, and on 31 July Merlin and the squadron capture the French vessel Papillon. Merlin also shared in the capture, on 15 September, of the Flora de Lisboa, off Havre.

Commander Robert Forbes replaced Brenton in January 1805. The proceeds were forwarded from Gibraltar.

In an enclosure to a letter dated 7 October 1805, Admiral Lord Nelson wrote, "Jalouse, Childers, and Merlin being unfit for the service of this Country, are ordered home with the first Convoy to be repaired".

Still, by March 1806 Merlin was in the West Indies, and under the command of Commander William Standway Parkinson. On 26 April Merlin escorted 16 vessels from Barbadoes to Demerara, Surinam, and Berbice.

Commander William Fisher replaced Parkinson on 25 February 1807.

By April 1807 Merlin was laid up. The navy paid her off in June at Portsmouth.

Fate
In October 1810 the Navy had Merlin fitted as a receiving ship at Portsmouth.

The "Commissioners for executing the office of Lord High Admiral" offered the Merlin sloop, of 395 tons (bm), lying at Portsmouth, for sale on 21 January 1836. The Commissioners sold her on that day for £510.

Notes

Citations

References

Nicolas, Sir Nicholas Harris (1846) The Dispatches and Letters of Vice Admiral Lord Viscount Nelson, with Notes. (Colburn)
 

Sloops of the Royal Navy
1801 ships